The Thirty-Six Immortal Women Poets (女房三十六歌仙 Nyōbō Sanjūrokkasen), is a canon of Japanese poets who were anthologized in the middle Kamakura Period. The compiler and exact date of the canon's construction is unknown, but it's reference is subsequently noted in the Gunsho Ruijū, volume 13. 

Five of the 36, Ono no Komachi, Lady Ise, Nakatsukasa, Saigū no Nyōgo and Kodai no Kimi also appeared in an earlier anthology with the similar title Thirty-Six Immortals of Poetry which dates from 1113 (late Heian Period). The poet Fujiwara no Kintō chose this original selection that preceded the Thirty-Six Immortal Women Poets.  

These five women poets from the original publication were included in the Thirty-Six Immortal Women Poets and canonized along with others from the Heian and Kamakura eras.

Role of women's court poetry in Heian-era Japan 
The women canonized in this compilation are typically noblewomen associated with the imperial court, for example, Lady Ise, consort to Emperor Uda, Inpumon'in no Tayū (literally the Attendant to Empress Inpu), Michitsuna no haha (literally, Michitsuna's mother), Fujiwara no Shunzei no Musume (Literally Shunzei Fujiwara's daughter). 

Scholars Esperanza Ramirez-Christensen and Yumiko Watanabe have suggested that the lack of a proper name or singular identity, symbolising broader structural power relations that marginalised court women, may have contributed to their autobiographic impulse to craft poetry.

Pre-modern Japanese Literature professor Roselee Bundy traces the contribution to women's court poetry reaching it's zenith in the mid Heian period as aesthetic communal events, before gradual professionalization of the genre began to exclude women’s voices beginning in the Kamakura period.

List of poets 

 【1】：Selected in the Thirty-Six Immortals of Poetry by Fujiwara no Kintō (1113).
 【2】：Selected in the Late Classical Thirty-Six Immortals of Poetry by ja:Fujiwara no Norikane in the late Heian period.
 【3】：Selected in the Ogura Hyakunin Isshu by Fujiwara no Teika in the early Kamakura period.
 【4】：Selected in the New Thirty-Six Immortals of Poetry by Fujiwara no Mototoshi and unknown compilers

Woodblock prints of the Thirty-Six Immortal Women Poets by Chōbunsai Eishi 
In 1801 the ukiyo-e painter Chōbunsai Eishi made a series of paintings to depict the thirty-six immortal women poets to accompany the calligraphy of each poet's verse, as produced by 36 girls who were students of Hanagata Giryu's (花形義融) calligraphy school "Hanagata Shodo". The album, reproduced with woodblock printing was intended to publicize the school. The 36 portraits are divided into a "left" (左) team and a "right" (右) team where the left team comprised poets who lived between the ninth and eleventh centuries, and the right team was made up of those poets that lived in the twelfth and thirteenth centuries. 

The teams square off in a pair-competition on each spread, which was a practice dating from the Heian period imperial court in the late ninth century. The Smithosonian researcher Andrew J. Pekarik compared this competitive social art form to poetry slams at the Nuyorican Poets Café in the 1990s.

The album was published by Nishimuraya Yohachi (Eijūdō) (西村屋与八(ja)) with an album binding (gajōsō) and also featured a woodblock printed cover designed by Hokusai. The block carvers were Yamaguchi Matsugorō (山口松五郎) Yamaguchi Seizō (山口清蔵).

References 

Poetry anthologies
Waka poets
Japanese poets
Japanese poets of the Heian period
Japanese women poets
Japanese women writers
9th-century Japanese poets
10th-century Japanese poets
11th-century Japanese poets
12th-century Japanese poets